Flapper pie is a vanilla custard pie topped with meringue (or sometimes whipped cream in South Saskatchewan). The Graham cracker cream pie dates back to the 19th century but entered Western Canadian pop culture in the 20th century as flapper pie.

The pie is a staple of the Canadian prairie culture. At the Salisbury House chain of restaurants in Winnipeg, it is sold as "wafer pie".

See also
 List of custard desserts

References 

Sweet pies
Custard desserts
Meringue desserts
Canadian cuisine
Cuisine of Manitoba

Cuisine of Western Canada